Dorstenia fawcettii is a plant species in the family Moraceae which is native to Jamaica and Haiti.

References

fawcettii
Plants described in 1929
Flora of Jamaica
Flora of Haiti
Flora without expected TNC conservation status